John Chroston of Tillicoultry, Clackmannanshire, a biology teacher at Falkirk High School, Scotland, was one of the few tourists present during the Indian Ocean earthquake able to recognize tsunami warning signs and prompt a beach evacuation. Another foreigner who issued an alert was 10-year-old British schoolgirl Tilly Smith at Maikhao Beach. At the island of Simeulue, near the epicenter, and in some villages in Indonesia, villagers who remembered past tsunamis alerted their communities.

Chroston, then 48 years old, was holidaying at Kamala Bay, near Phuket, Thailand, with his daughter Rebecca and his wife Sandra Adams, a professor at Stirling University. He was swimming when the sea receded, and instantly recognized the early-warning sign for a tsunami. He ran up the beach, sounding the alarm and gathering up his wife and daughter. 

With the assistance of a Thai doctor, Harpreet Grover, Chroston persuaded a hotel shuttle bus driver to turn his bus around and take passengers to high ground. The bus stopped to pick up a few Thai women and children on the way. It was at one point engulfed by the wave, but he managed to pull through and reached high ground.

References

 

2004 Indian Ocean earthquake and tsunami
Living people
Year of birth missing (living people)
Scottish schoolteachers
People from Clackmannanshire